Richal Leitoe (born 19 April 1983 in Willemstad, Curaçao, in the former Netherlands Antilles) is a football player who plays for HFC EDO Zaterdag.

He played for two seasons at FC Utrecht before joining FC Den Bosch in 2005. He returned to amateur football in 2007.

He was call-up to national team for 2010 FIFA World Cup qualification in March 2008.

Honours
Utrecht
KNVB Cup: 2003–04

References

External links
Profile at Voetbal International

1983 births
Living people
Curaçao footballers
Dutch Antillean footballers
Netherlands Antilles international footballers
Association football midfielders
Eredivisie players
Eerste Divisie players
Derde Divisie players
FC Utrecht players
FC Den Bosch players
People from Willemstad
Excelsior Maassluis players
FC Lisse players